gnac is a pseudonym used by songwriter and music producer Mark Tranmer. The name is derived from a short story by Italo Calvino in Marcovaldo titled Luna e GNAC (or "moon and gnac").

Tranmer's music has been described as "imaginary film soundtracks" with comparisons made to Michael Nyman, Ennio Morricone, and Michel Legrand. Vini Reilly has been identified as an influence.

After releasing several singles between 1998 and early 1999, his debut album, Friend Sleeping, was released in July 1999 on the Vespertine label. For his second studio album he moved to Alan McGee's Poptones label. Tranmer also recorded with Roger Quigley under the name The Montgolfier Brothers, releasing two albums.

Tranmer has also released an album under his own name, and has recorded with Ian Masters (of Pale Saints/Spoonfed Hybrid) under the name Wingdisk.

Discography

Gnac

Albums
Friend Sleeping (1999), Vespertine
Biscuit Barrel Fashion (2001), Poptones
Twelve Sidelong Glances (2006), LTM/Boutique NL
The Arrival of the Fog (2007), LTM/Boutique NL
The Red Pages (2010), Vertical Features

Compilations
Sevens (2000), Rocket Girl
Soviet Bureau (2004), Russia-only release via Soyuz

Singles, EPs
In Mauve EP (1998), Amberly
"The Moustache" (1998), Earworm
"A Tangle With..." (1998), Kooky
"Our Distance" (1999), Darla
"Hennebert Sleeve" (1999), Liquefaction
"18th Century Quiz Show" (1999), Acetone
Split single with Smooth Operator (2001), Octane Gramaphone

Mark Tranmer
Scoop of Ice-cream Moon (2004), Kooky

with The Montgolfier Brothers

Albums
Seventeen Stars (1999), Vespertine
The World Is Flat (2002), Poptones
All My Bad Thoughts (2005), Poptones

Singles
"Pro Celebrity Standing Around" (2001), Poptones

with Wingdisk
Time Is Running Out EP (2003), Isonauta

References

External links
gnac/Mark Tranmer on MySpace
gnac biography from LTM

Year of birth missing (living people)
Living people
Place of birth missing (living people)
British songwriters
Rocket Girl artists